Yu Wai Ting (born August 1, 1993) is a freestyle swimmer from Hong Kong. At the 2010 Asian Games, she was part of Hong Kong's bronze-medal winning 400 Free Relay.

She has swum for Hong Kong at:
Asian Games: 2010
Asian Indoor Games: 2009
Asian Swimming Championships: 2009
Youth Olympics: 2010

References

1993 births
Living people
Hong Kong female freestyle swimmers
Asian Games medalists in swimming
Swimmers at the 2010 Asian Games
Swimmers at the 2010 Summer Youth Olympics
Medalists at the 2010 Asian Games
Asian Games bronze medalists for Hong Kong